The Pacific spiny lumpsucker (Eumicrotremus orbis) is a species of bony fish in the family Cyclopteridae.

Description

They have a wide mouth with large lips, and protruding eyes. The fish also has a squared dorsal fin, rounded caudal fin, and thin, transparent pectoral fins.

The lumpsucker's pelvic fins have evolved into a large, fringed suction cup, allowing it to attach to surfaces. This sucker also compensates the fish for its lack of gas bladder. Because of their large, rounded shape with small fins, Pacific spiny lumpsuckers are ineffective swimmers and are most commonly found attached to solid objects.

They do not have scales. Instead, the body of the fish is covered in cone-shaped plates, called tubercles. Females have more tubercles than males.

The Pacific spiny lumpsucker is seen in many colors, including brown and green, often with yellow or orange highlights. Females are dull green in color, while males are dull orange to reddish brown.

Behavior

Pacific spiny lumpsuckers are often found alone in nature. When disturbed, they swim about aimlessly, hindered by their inefficient swimming. Instead, the fish relies on effective camouflage to avoid detection from predators.

They are considered harmless to humans. In fact, they are known to eat out of the hands of divers.

Distribution and habitat

Pacific spiny lumpsuckers are found from northern Washington state, especially Puget Sound, to the Aleutian Islands of Alaska. They can also be found in the Bering Sea, the Chukchi Sea and around northern Japan.<ref name= >

This species inhabits a wide variety of habitats, including eelgrass beds, rocky reefs, kelp patches, and other algae growth. They are also found around shallow bays and docks.

Ecology

Diet

Pacific spiny lumpsuckers feed on slow crustaceans, polychaete worms, and mollusks on the sandy or muddy sea floor.

Reproduction

The species is known to spawn in shallow, warmer waters between the months of July and October. The females lay large, spherical, orange-colored eggs on rocks, in sheltered holes. Females typically lay around 200 eggs at a time in the nest and the male fertilizes them. After the eggs are laid, the male attaches himself to a nearby surface where he cares for the eggs by defending them from predators and circulating water over them with his fin.

Predators

Pacific cod, sablefish, marine sculpins, and lancefish are known predators of pacific spiny lumpsuckers. Crabs, sea stars and small fishes prey on lumpfish eggs.

Climate change

While the Pacific spiny lumpsucker has not yet been evaluated by the IUCN Red List, climate change may pose a threat to the species. The fish relies on shallow waters for breeding and eelgrass for habitat. Rising sea levels and warmer water temperatures threaten these habitats, and the species' survival.

References

Pacific spiny lumpsucker
Fish of the Americas
Fish of the Pacific Ocean
Taxa named by Albert Günther
Fish described in 1861